Mazibaleh or Mezeybleh or Mazbaleh may refer to:
 Mazibaleh-ye Lafiteh
 Mazibaleh-ye Sofla